Quảng Đông is a commune (xã) and village in Quảng Trạch District, Quảng Bình Province, in Vietnam. As of 2019, it had a population of 5,285, with a population density of 200 people/km².

Populated places in Quảng Bình province
Communes of Quảng Bình province